Mahmudabad-e Sofla (also Romanized as Maḩmūdābād-e Soflá and Mahmūdābād-e Soflá) is a village in Hulasu Rural District, in the Central District of Shahin Dezh County, West Azerbaijan Province, Iran. At the 2006 census, its population was 124, in 22 families.

References 

Populated places in Shahin Dezh County